House of Jamalullail may refer to:
 House of Jamalullail (Perlis),  the current ruling house of the state of Perlis in Malaysia
 House of Jamalullail (Perak), one of the oldest Syed clans in Malaysia